is a song by Japanese folk group  from their album  (1974).

A cover by  released as a single in 1975 became her most successful track, and Nagoriyuki has since been covered by a lengthy list of other artists (see :ja:なごり雪#その他のカバー). A 2002 movie directed by Nobuhiko Obayashi uses the song as a central theme, and Iruka recorded a Korean rendition for the 2004 movie Chirusoku no Natsu.

References

1974 songs
Japanese songs